Poikkal Kudhirai''' may refer to:

 Poikkal Kudhirai (1983 film), an Indian Tamil-language comedy directed by  K. Balachander
 Poikkal Kudhirai (2022 film), an Indian Tamil-language action film directed by Santhosh P. Jayakumar.
 Poikkaal Kuthirai Aattam, one of the folk dances of Tamil Nadu.